Pholidoscelis maynardi, commonly known as the Great Inagua ameiva, Inagua ameiva, or Inagua blue-tailed lizard, is species of lizard, a member of the family Teiidae. The species is endemic to the Bahamas. Three subspecies have been described.

Etymology
The specific name, maynardi, is in honor of American ornithologist Charles Johnson Maynard.

Description
Males of P. maynardi measure an average of 72 mm (2.83 in) snout-vent length (SVL), and females average 70 mm (2.76 in) SVL.

Diet
P. maynardi is mainly insectivorous, however, little is known of its natural history.

Habitat
P. maynardi is often encountered in the upper beach zone. It prefers sandy and loamy areas, but is also found in rocky and sparse vegetative areas.

Reproduction
P. maynardi is oviparous.

Subspecies and distribution
Three subspecies are recognized as being valid, including the nominotypical subspecies. The species is found only in Inagua, Bahamas.

Pholidoscelis maynardi maynardi  – northern and western coasts of Great Inagua Island
Pholidoscelis maynardi parvinaguae <ref>Barbour T, Shreve B (1936). "New races of Tropidophis and of Ameiva from the Bahamas". Proceedings of the New England Zoölogical Club 40: 347-365. (Ameiva maynardi parvinauguae, new subspecies).</ref> – Little InaguaPholidoscelis maynardi uniformis  – eastern and southern portions of Great Inagua Island

References

Further reading
Campbell DG (1981). The Ephemeral Islands: A Natural History of the Bahamas. London and Basingstoke: Macmillan Education. 160 pp. .
Garman S (1888). "Reptiles and Batrachians from the Caymans and from the Bahamas. Collected by Prof. C. J. Maynard for the Museum of Comparative Zoology at Cambridge, Mass." Bulletin of the Essex Institute 20: 101-113.  (Ameiva maynardii, new species, pp. 110–111).
Goicoehea N, Frost DR, De la Riva I, Pellegrino KCM, Sites J, Rodrigues MT, Padial JM (2016). "Molecular systematics of teioid lizards (Teioidea/Gymnophthalmoidea: Squamata) based on the analysis of 48 loci under tree-alignment and similarity-alignment". Cladistics 32: 624-671. (Philodoscelis maynardi, new combination).
Schwartz A, Henderson RW (1991). Amphibians and Reptiles of the West Indies: Descriptions, Distributions, and Natural History. Gainesville: University of Florida Press. 714 pp. .
Schwartz A, Thomas R (1975). A Check-list of West Indian Amphibians and Reptiles. Carnegie Museum of Natural History Special Publication No. 1. Pittsburgh, Pennsylvania: Carnegie Museum of Natural History. 216 pp. (Ameiva maynardi'', pp. 60–61).

maynardi
Lizards of North America
Reptiles of the Bahamas
Endemic fauna of the Bahamas
Reptiles described in 1888
Taxa named by Samuel Garman
Inagua